

Achievements in Europe

Matches in Europe

Hapoel Tel Aviv in European group stages

Champions League

2010–11 Group B

Europa League

2009–10 Group C

2011–12 Group C

2012–13 Group B

UEFA Cup

2006–07 Group G

2007–08 Group G

Hapoel Tel Aviv in European knockout phases

UEFA Cup

2006–07 – Round of 32

Rangers won 5–2 on aggregate.

Europa League

2009–10 – Round of 32

Rubin Kazan won 3–0 on aggregate.

Match Statistics By Competition
As of 21 July 2013.

UEFA Team Ranking

References

Hapoel Tel Aviv F.C.
Israeli football clubs in international competitions